Elachista symmorpha is a moth of the family Elachistidae. It is found in California and Oregon in the United States.

The length of the forewings is 5.5 mm. The costa in the basal fifth of the forewing is gray. The ground color is white, irregularly dusted with dark brown tips of scales, forming an elongate spot in the middle of the wing at the fold. The hindwings are light gray and the underside of the wings is brownish gray.

References

Moths described in 1948
symmorpha
Moths of North America